Jabri is one of the 44 union councils, administrative subdivisions, of Haripur District in the Khyber Pakhtunkhwa province of Pakistan. Union Council Jabri 8 Villages Jabri, Bandi,Lanjiyaan syedaan, dhakan paisar, Kohala Nallah. Tayal, Darkot, Akhora, Budhar.

References

Union councils of Haripur District